BJ's Restaurants, Inc. is an American restaurant chain, headquartered in Huntington Beach, California. The chain operates under the names BJ's Restaurant & Brewery, BJ's Restaurant & Brewhouse, BJ's Grill, and BJ's Pizza & Grill. BJ's menu features pizza, beers, appetizers, entrees, pastas, sandwiches, salads, and desserts. Some locations feature microbreweries that supply beer to other locations in the chain.

History

BJ's was founded in 1978 and first opened in Santa Ana, California, as BJ's Chicago Pizzeria by Jim Kozen and Leonard Allenstein. The original name was BJ Grunts, but due to a Federal Trademark conflict with RJ Grunts, a Chicago-based hamburger shop, the name was changed. Shortly after the opening of the first restaurant, Mike Phillips and Bill Cunningham bought 50% of the company for $14,000. Kozen and Allenstein left the group after the opening of the 7th store.  Phillips and Cunningham sold their company to their accountants Paul Motenko and Jerry Hennessy in 1991.

By 1996, seven restaurants had opened between San Diego and Los Angeles. Originally known as Chicago Pizza, the company went public in 1996, raising $9.4 million. The company then bought 26 Pietro's Pizza restaurants in March 1996 in a $2.8 million deal in cash and assumed debt, but then sold off seven of the locations with plans to convert the remaining Pietro's to what was then BJ's Pizza. During the same year, the company opened a microbrewery at its Brea restaurant.

Between 2010 and 2011, the National Retail Federation named it one of the 10 fastest-growing restaurants in the U.S. based on year-over-year sales.

In October 2012, Greg Trojan became president and CEO.

In 2013, BJ's produced a combined total of 60,000 barrels annually at their 11 brewery restaurants to serve their chain of 136 restaurants in 15 states. In 2010, the company's BJ's Hefelightzen was awarded a gold medal at the Great American Beer Festival.

Operations 
, BJ's operated 215 restaurants in 29 states.

Awards and recognition 
Some of the company's beers have been awarded gold and silver medals at various beer brewing competitions throughout the world.

References

External links

1978 establishments in California
Restaurants in California
Companies listed on the Nasdaq
Restaurants established in 1978
Restaurant chains in the United States
Companies based in Huntington Beach, California
American companies established in 1978